Bread and Milk (Slovene: Kruh in mleko) is a 2001 Slovene film directed by Jan Cvitkovič. It was Slovenia's submission to the 74th Academy Awards for the Academy Award for Best Foreign Language Film, but was not accepted as a nominee.

See also
List of submissions to the 74th Academy Awards for Best Foreign Language Film

References

External links

2001 films
2001 drama films
Slovenian black-and-white films
Slovene-language films
Slovenian drama films
Films set in Slovenia